Delgahawaththage Raj Kumar Somadeva (born 31 October 1960) is a Senior Professor in Archaeology at the Postgraduate Institute of Archaeology, University of Kelaniya in Sri Lanka, and a Senior Fellow of the Sri Lanka Council of Archaeologists. He has received the Charles Wallace Research Fellowship from the Institute of Archeology at University College London in 2005.

Early life 
Delgahawaththage Raj Kumar Somadeva was born on 31 October 1960 in Wellawaya, Sri Lanka. He is the eldest among a family of six children.

As his father was a government public servant, the family moved around the country, and he therefore had to switch schools regularly. As a result, he had attended Poojapitiya Madhya Maha Vidyalaya, Nivithigala Sumana Maha Vidyalaya, Ehaliyagoda Dharmapala Vidyalaya, Hidellana Sivali Madhya Maha Vidyalaya, Minuwangoda Nalanda Vidyalaya, Pitipana Roman Catholic Vidyalaya, Kalutara Holycross College and eventually Kalutara Vidyalaya.

Higher education 
He received his Bachelor of Arts degree in Archaeology in 1986, and in 1994 earned his Master of Philosophy degree in the same discipline, both from the University of Kelaniya. In 2006 he obtained his Doctor of Philosophy degree in Archaeology from the Department of Archaeology and Ancient History at Uppsala University in Sweden.

He is a student of Professor Senake Bandaranayake, and Professor Paul Sinclair at the Uppsala University.

Career 
Somadeva served as an Assistant Director of the Sigiriya - UNESCO - Sri Lanka Cultural Triangle Project from 1989 to 1994. During that period he also worked as the Field Director of the German-Sri Lanka collaboration excavation project and the Swedish-Sri Lanka Settlement archaeology project held in Sigiriya-Dambulla region.

He contributed his service as a member of the advisory committee to the Director General of Archaeology in Sri Lanka and to the Department of National Archives.

In 2013, he was appointed as a member of the National Research Council of Sri Lanka.

He also extended his capacity to revise the history teaching syllabuses in schools and has written several chapters to the current history textbooks.

, he serves as a senior professor in archaeology at the Postgraduate Institute of Archaeology, University of Kelaniya.

In 2022, he was appointed as a member of the advisory committee to the Ministry of Tourism in Sri Lanka.

Currently, he is serving as a consultant to several projects funded by the UNDP.

Research 
Somadeva's main field of study is ancient urbanisation in Sri Lanka. He spent six years from 1999 to 2005 in the south and south-eastern part of Sri Lanka to understand the historical development of urbanism in that area which has been described in the national historical chronicles and the lithic inscriptions. During that period he undertook several macro-scale reconnaissance surveys and nine archaeological excavations in the Lower Kirindi Oya basin. The results of the fieldwork were presented to his doctoral degree at Uppsala University as his thesis, The Origins of Urbanism in Southern Sri Lanka.

After completing his PhD, he investigated the problems related to the pre and proto-historic transition in Sri Lanka. As a result of his fieldwork, he identified a new transitional phase in the later prehistory occupied by the advanced hunter-gatherers of the Holocene. Somadeva was able to explain how the late Holocene hunter-gatherers were resilient to climate change and how they adapted to floral resource exploitation for their survival. Now he is concerned to understand the cognitive advances of the advanced hunter-gatherers of the late Holocene in the country.

Somadeva won a Competitive Research Grant from the National Science Foundation in 2017 and 2019 for his research on Environmental adaptations of the Holocene hunter-gatherers in Sri Lanka.

He has published seventy-five research papers both locally and internationally, in addition to his seventeen books.

Somadeva considers that Buddhism existed in Sri Lanka before the arrival of Mahinda, and that the history of Sri Lanka goes beyond the period of Vijaya and Kuveni. This is contrary to the widely accepted view, which is that promoted by the 5th-century Mahawamsa.

Recognition and honours 
In 1998 he won the top ten in Sri Lanka Award for the category of Academic Leadership and Accomplishment.

In 2005 he was awarded the Charles Wallace Research Fellowship from the Institute of Archaeology at University College London.

He is also a member of the World Archaeological Congress.

His publication titled Rock Paintings and Engraving Sites in Sri Lanka won the State Literary Award for the Best Academic Publication in English, in the year 2013.

Bibliography

Books

Author

Co-author

Editor

Select papers, articles

Conference papers

Chapters

Articles 

 
 
 
 
 
 
 
 
 
 
 
 
 
 
 Rock Paintings & Engraving in Sri Lanka

External links 

 OCLC WorldCat Identities - Somadeva, Raj
 Google Scholar - Raj Somadeva
 ResearchGate - Raj Somadeva

References 

Sinhalese archaeologists
Sri Lankan archaeologists
Sinhalese academics
Historians of Sri Lanka
1960 births
Living people
Academic staff of the University of Kelaniya
Alumni of the University of Kelaniya
Uppsala University alumni